Protée (Q155) was a Redoutable-class submarine of the French Navy. The class is also known as the "1500-ton class" and were termed in French .

History

Development
Protée was one of 31 Redoutable-class submarines, also designated as the 1500 ton boats because of their displacement. The class entered service between 1931 and 1939.

The submarines' electrical propulsion allowed them to attain speeds of  while submerged.

Laid down on 4 October 1928, Protée was launched on 31 July 1930 and commissioned on 1 November 1932.

Second World War
At the beginning of the Second World War Protée was assigned to the 3rd Submarine Division, based at Toulon, alongside her sisters Achéron, Fresnel and Actéon. At the beginning of February 1940 the 3rd Submarine Division was briefly transferred to Casablanca to carry out surveillance of the Canary Islands, where a couple of German cargo ships were present. The submarine division was then assigned to the Mediterranean theatre on 12 April, first at Bizerte then, without the Fresnel, at Beirut, under the authority the British commander-in-chief in Alexandria. Protéetook part in several patrols in the Dodecanese until the signing of the armistice between France and Germany on 22 June 1940. On 25 June, the date the armistice came into force, the captain of Protée ignored an order to return to Beirut, and instead sailed to Alexandria, becoming part of Force X. The captain was chastised for this incident.

Force X continued in action with the Allies until June 1943, when after several months of negotiations with the French Forces of Africa, to form the French Forces of the Liberation. Protée left Alexandria on 18 June to sail to Oran, departing Oran during November. On 22 November, during the boat's first mission, she torpedoed a German cargo ship off Agay, but failed to sink her.

On 18 December 1943 Protée, under the command of Capitaine de corvette Georges Millé, sailed to patrol off Marseilles but never returned. The French Navy long thought that the loss of Protée was due to a surface engagement with a German naval vessel. However a dive conducted in 1995 confirmed the theory developed by the United States Navy in the 1950s that the submarine's loss was caused by striking a mine. There was no mention of an engagement with an Allied submarine in the German naval archives.

Protée disappeared on 20 December 1943 with the loss of all hands, including three Royal Navy liaison personnel. The later submarine Laubie was named after the Protées chief engineer, Louis Laubie.

Discovery of the wreck 
Analyses of the damage indicated that she was probably lost after hitting a mine. The wreck was declared a war memorial by the Navy.

Sources and references

Notes, citations, and references
Notes

Citations

References
 
 

External links

Redoutable-class submarines (1928)
Ships built in France
1930 ships
World War II submarines of France
Ships sunk by mines
Submarines of the Free French Naval Forces
Maritime incidents in December 1943
Lost submarines of France
World War II shipwrecks in the Mediterranean Sea